Maramureș County is a county (județ) 
in Romania, in the Maramureș region. The county seat is Baia Mare.

Name
In Hungarian it is known as Máramaros megye, in Ukrainian as Мараморо́щина, in German as Kreis Marmarosch, and in Yiddish as מארמאראש.

Demographics 

 Romanians – 82.38% (380,018)
 Hungarians – 7.53% (34,781)
 Ukrainians (including Hutsuls and other Rusyns) – 6.77% (31,234)
 Romani – 2.73% (12,638)
 Germans (Zipser Germans and Transylvanian Saxons) – 0.27% (1,243)
 Others – 0.32%

Geography 
Maramureș County is situated in the northern part of Romania, and has a border with Ukraine. Together with the Gutâi and Țibleș mountain ranges, the Rodna mountains are part of the Eastern Carpathians. The rest of the county are hills, plateaus, and valleys. The county is crossed by Tisa River and its main tributaries: the Iza, Vișeu, and Mara rivers.

Neighbours 

 Suceava County to the East.
 Satu Mare County to the West.
 Ukraine to the North – Ivano-Frankivsk Oblast and Zakarpattia Oblast.
 Sălaj County, Cluj County, and Bistrița-Năsăud County to the South.

Economy 
Maramureș is known for its pastoral and agricultural traditions, largely unscathed by the industrialisation campaign was carried on during Romania's communist period. Ploughing, planting, harvesting, and hay making and handling are mostly done through manual labour. The county is also home to a strong mining industry of extraction of metals other than iron. The industrial plants built around Baia Mare during the communist period heavily polluted the area in the past, but recently, due to the decline of the city's industrial activity, the area has become less polluted.

Tourism 

The region is known for its beautiful rural scenery, local small woodwork and craftwork industry as well as for its churches and original rural architecture. There are not many paved roads in the rural areas, but most of them are usually accessible.

The county's main tourist attractions are:
 The cities of Baia Mare and Sighetu Marmației.
 The villages on the Iza, Mara, and Vișeu Valleys.
 The Wooden churches of Maramureș
 The wooden churches of 
 The wooden churches of 
 The Merry Cemetery of Săpânța
 The Rodna Mountains, the Rodna Mountains National Park, and the Maramureș Mountains Natural Park. 
 The landscape of Cavnic.
 The Memorial of the Victims of Communism and of the Resistance in Sighetu Marmației.

Politics 
The Maramureș County Council, elected at the 2020 local elections, consists of 34 councillors, with the following party composition:

Administrative divisions 

Maramureș County has 2 municipalities, 11 towns and 63 communes.
Municipalities
Baia Mare - county seat; population: 114,925 (as of 2011)
Sighetu Marmației

Towns
Baia Sprie
Borșa
Cavnic
Dragomirești
Săliștea de Sus
Seini
Șomcuta Mare
Târgu Lăpuș
Tăuții-Măgherăuș
Ulmeni
Vișeu de Sus

Communes
Ardusat
Ariniș
Asuaju de Sus
Băița de sub Codru
Băiuț
Bârsana
Băsești
Bicaz
Bistra
Bocicoiu Mare
Bogdan Vodă
Boiu Mare
Botiza
Breb
Budești
Călinești
Câmpulung la Tisa
Cernești
Cicârlău
Coaș
Coltău
Copalnic-Mănăștur
Coroieni
Cupșeni
Desești
Dumbrăvița
Fărcașa
Gârdani
Giulești
Groși
Groșii Țibleșului
Ieud
Lăpuș
Leordina
Mireșu Mare
Moisei
Oarța de Jos
Ocna Șugatag
Onceşti
Petrova
Poienile de sub Munte
Poienile Izei
Recea
Remetea Chioarului
Remeți
Repedea
Rona de Jos
Rona de Sus
Rozavlea
Ruscova
Săcălășeni
Săcel
Sălsig
Săpânța
Sarasău
Satulung
Șieu
Șișești
Strâmtura
Suciu de Sus
Vadu Izei
Valea Chioarului
Vima Mică
Vișeu de Jos

Historical county

History

 In 1199, the region is first attested.
 In 1241 the Tatar invasion decimated about half of the local population.
 In the 14th century Duke (knyaz) Bogdan of Maramureș, said to be founder of Moldavia. In that century, it was reorganized to Máramaros County
 In the Middle Ages, the historical region of Máramaros (Maramureș) was known for its salt mines and later for its lumber.

In 1920, under the Treaty of Trianon, the northern part of the county became part of newly-formed Czechoslovakia, while the southern part (including Sighetu Marmației) became part of the Kingdom of Romania.

After the administrative unification law in 1925, the county remained as it was, with an identical name and territory.

In 1938, King Carol II promulgated a new Constitution, and subsequently he had the administrative division of the Romanian territory changed. Maramureș County became part of Ținutul Crișuri.

In August 1940, under the auspices of Nazi Germany, which imposed the Second Vienna Award, the county was transferred back to Hungary with the rest of Northern Transylvania. In October 1944, Romanian forces with Soviet assistance recaptured the ceded territory and reintegrated it into Romania, re-establishing the county. Romanian jurisdiction over the county per the Treaty of Trianon was reaffirmed in the Paris Peace Treaties, 1947. The counties of Romania, including Maramureș, were disestablished by the communist government of Romania in 1950 in favour of regions, and re-established in 1968 when Romania restored the county administrative system.

Administration

In 1930, the county was originally divided into three districts (plăși):
Plasa Iza
Plasa Sighet (headquartered at Sighet)
Plasa Vișeu (headquartered at Vișeu de Sus)

Subsequently, the Iza and Sighet districts were reorganized into three districts, adding one:
Plasa Șugatag (headquartered at Ocna Șugatag)

Population 
According to the 1930 census, the county's population was 194,619, 57.9% Romanian, 20.9% Jews, 11.9% Ruthenians (including Ukrainians), 6.9% Hungarians, 2.0% Germans, as well as other minorities. The following composition was recorded from the religious point of view: 64.4% Greek Catholic, 21.0% Jewish, 6.4% Roman Catholic, 5.3% Eastern Orthodox, 1.8% Reformed, as well as other minorities.

Urban population 
In 1930 the county's urban population ethnically consisted of 38.6% Jews, 35.4% Romanians, 19.9% Hungarians, 4.5% Ruthenians (including Ukrainians), as well as other minorities. Yiddish was spoken by 36.6% of the urban population, followed by Romanian (33.7%), Hungarian (25.7%), Ukrainian (2.3%), as well as other minorities. From the religious point of view, the urban inhabitants were Jewish (38.9%), Greek Catholics (38.0%), Roman Catholics (12.8%), Reformed (5.7%), Eastern Orthodox (3.5%), as well as other minorities.

People 
Natives of the county include:
Augustin Buzura
Ștefan Hrușcă
Gheorghe Pop de Băsești
Paula Seling
Elie Wiesel

References

External links 
 English translation of the Máramaros Yizkor Book Sefer Marmarosh; mea ve-shishim kehilot kedoshot be-yishuvan u-ve-hurbanan published in 1983 and 1996 (history and remembrance book of the approximately 160 Máramaros area Jewish shtetls and communities, and their destruction in the Holocaust)

 
Counties of Romania
Geography of Transylvania
1925 establishments in Romania
1938 disestablishments in Romania
1944 establishments in Romania
1950 disestablishments in Romania
1968 establishments in Romania
States and territories established in 1925
States and territories disestablished in 1938
States and territories established in 1944
States and territories disestablished in 1950
States and territories established in 1968
Rusyn communities